Black Orchid (written as "B. Orchid" or just "Orchid" in the games) is a player character in the Killer Instinct fighting game series created by Rare. Introduced as one of two female characters in the original Killer Instinct in 1994, Orchid has appeared in every entry in the series to date. A mysterious spy and fighter, she is the female protagonist of the series, along with her younger brother Jago, and is one of the most famous and best received Killer Instinct characters.

Appearances
In Killer Instinct (1994), Black Orchid is a 23-year-old enigmatic and lethal secret agent for a vigilante-oriented international spy organization. Posing as a secretary, she infiltrates Ultratech, the company which organizes the Killer Instinct tournament, to uncover the truth behind the mysterious disappearances related to it. In her ending, she successfully gathers enough information to defeat Ultratech.

In the sequel, Killer Instinct 2 (1996), it is revealed that the now 24-year-old Black Orchid has destroyed Eyedol (the first game's boss), which sent the Ultratech building two millennia into the past. Now she seeks to destroy Gargos, and find a way home to start a new life. In her endings, the warrior Jago is revealed as her younger brother.

Orchid appears in the series reboot, Killer Instinct (2013). Raised by her single father Jacob, a member of Seal Team 6, Orchid exhibits emotional instability from a young age, once nearly burning down her school while placing blame on what she refers to as "the Firecat". Following this, Jacob takes her to an isolated mountain cabin for training, as Orchid had inherited the ability to summon the Firecat from her grandmother, who gained it following her participation in the Project Aries 9 experiment during World War II. Fearing the government or Ultratech would use her as a tool, he teaches her combat, weapons usage, and summoning the Firecat. Two years later, they are found by the Special Warfare Department, a covert sect of the U.S.'s Homeland Security, and Jacob is forced to return to service in exchange for her freedom, being killed in a suicide bombing a year later. Running from her new foster family and living on the streets, the teenage Orchid is eventually found by SWD commander Major Weaver, who reveals Jacob was in fact assassinated by Ultratech, giving her his journal, and asks her to join the organization. Orchid agrees and begins taking on missions for them, piecing together clues linking Ultratech to a terrorist cabal, while discovering from Jacob's journal that he had an affair and fathered a son.

A decade later, Weaver assigns Orchid to a deep cover operation at Ultratech posing as a scientist, where she first learns of the Pinnacle Protocol and that several SWD members are under ARIA's control. However, her cover is blown and she destroys the lab with her Firecat and escapes. Disbelieving her findings, Weaver claims that Orchid has become paranoid and unstable and dismisses her, but is killed in a bombing later that night. Accused of Weaver's murder, Orchid is branded a terrorist and forced to flee the country. Believing that Ultratech framed her, Orchid emigrates to the Carpathian Mountains in Eastern Europe, where she forms an underground spy ring known as the Disavowed, made up of others wronged by Ultratech who seek to take them down. During her missions, she meets and befriends Maya and recruits Eagle to the Disavowed, sending him to infiltrate the Killer Instinct tournament. When Eagle is reported dead, Orchid takes on the Black Orchid persona and joins the tournament to find out what happened, where she is almost killed by Jago before realizing he is her brother, the two vowing to find out what had happened to Orchid's father and Jago's mother. Orchid later teams up with T.J. Combo to destroy an Ultratech laboratory and broadcast evidence of their crimes to the world. She joins Maya's rebel force alongside T.J. and Jago, but they are trapped by Ultratech forces while ARIA's plan to summon Gargos is brought to fruition. However, the attack is halted for reasons unknown, with Ultratech's forces ordered to retreat. She and the other rebels are later forced to join ARIA's alliance in order to stop Gargos when he proves too strong to defeat alone.

Outside of the game series, B. Orchid is featured in the 1996 Killer Instinct comics, where she is one of the main protagonists. In 2008, Rare created Vision Cards based on her and other Killer Instinct fighters for use in their video game Viva Piñata: Trouble in Paradise.

Though Black Orchid's race is not mentioned in the games, when questioned on the issue Rare stated that she is mulatto.

Gameplay
Black Orchid's fighting style emphasizes Kali (aka Eskrima) stick fighting in the original Killer Instinct and the 2013 game, and Okinawan tonfa in Killer Instinct 2. In all games, she also uses kicks, including one special move that resembles Chun-Li's Spinning Bird Kick. In Killer Instinct, one of her special moves has her morph into a "fire cat". In Killer Instinct 2, Orchid was given a complete gameplay overhaul, which included losing her tiger morph special move.

One of Orchid's original finishing moves has her giving a defeated enemy a heart attack by stripping and showing her breasts to them. It was featured only in the first game for the arcades and SNES; the Game Boy version features only the other one, where she turns an enemy into a frog and then stomps on it. Orchid turns her back to the player when performing the flashing move. A popular rumor stated that by positioning her in front of a mirror and performing this finishing move, the player could see her breasts reflected in the mirror. In response to this rumor, designer Ken Lobb pointed out that there is no mirror in any of Killer Instincts stages.

While Orchid retains many of her classic moves in the 2013 title, she has also been given several new skills, such as the ability to use her Fire Cat as a projectile in Instinct Mode and as part of her Shadow moves. Her classic "retro" costume was included as unlockable content in a patch for the game. According to Prima Games, Orchid is a very balanced character who "lives and dies by the 50/50 mix-up". While Orchid "seems lacking compared to the other characters" in that "her special moves are mostly unsafe and she doesn't have that one abusive tactic that most of the other characters seem to possess", she has the fastest movement speed and her Instinct mode is one of the best in the game.

Reception
Black Orchid ranked as the most popular Killer Instinct character among fans of the series according to an official poll by the 2013 game's developer Double Helix Games on Facebook, receiving 23% of the votes; multiple gaming publications have called her "everyone's favorite" character. GamesRadar stated "For some old-school gamers, B. Orchid stands above Chun-Li as the iconic First Lady of fighting games." GamesTM commented in 2004: "Of all the characters available, B. Orchid proved to be among the most popular. Whether that was down to her ease of use or the fact that her chest bounced around like crazy remains a mystery..."  According to Rare Gamer, "found plastered on the sides of KI2 cabinets everywhere, B. Orchid has become nearly synonymous with any mention of Killer Instinct, and her return would send the community into celebration". In 2014, she was ranked as the 95th best looking "game girl" by Brazilian GameHall's Portal PlayGame. 

Orchid's "flashing" finishing move was a source of much media attention, including being ranked the fifth most creative video game death by Wired in 2009. In 2011, it was ranked third on a list of the "craziest fatalities" in gaming by Complex, while UGO.com listed the finisher "where she whips out her sweater puppies and causes her opponent to have a boner-related heart attack" as the 47th nastiest cinematic kill in video games. In 2012, Houston Press ranked it the fifth stupidest 'fatality' in any game, as "this causes the male characters to have heart attacks and die" even if they are not human. In ScrewAttack's Death Battle, Orchid won against Soulcalibur'''s Ivy Valentine by using her other classic finishing move, which turns the defeated opponent into a toad.

On the other hand, GamePro included her in a 2011 list titled "Six of the Most Broken Characters in Videogame History", saying she is "a forgettable character", and is broken due to her unstoppable combo sequence. Rob Bricken of Topless Robot criticized her original appearance as a stock character of "a comically over-sexualized woman": "It's hard to pin down the fighting-game world's most blatantly objectified female character, but B. Orchid may well be it. Unless, of course, it was all a joke". In a contemporary review of Killer Instinct Gold, Next Generation'' likewise derided her comic over-sexualization, at one point employing the phrase "as sure as Orchid's breasts are fake".

References

Female characters in video games
Fictional American people in video games
Fictional kobudōka
Fictional female martial artists
Fictional American secret agents
Killer Instinct characters
Microsoft protagonists
Fictional secret agents and spies in video games
Fictional stick-fighters
Fictional swordfighters in video games
Shapeshifter characters in video games
Video game characters introduced in 1994
Video game characters who use magic
Video game characters with fire or heat abilities
Vigilante characters in video games
Woman soldier and warrior characters in video games